Richard Paul Lohse (September 13, 1902 – September 16, 1988) was a Swiss painter and graphic artist and one of the main representatives of the concrete and constructive art movements.

Lohse was born in Zürich in 1902. His wish to study in Paris was thwarted due to his difficult economic circumstances. In 1918, he joined the advertising agency Max Dalang, where he trained to become an advertising designer. Lohse, then an autodidact, painted expressive, late-cubist still lifes.

In the 1930s, his work as a graphic artist and book designer placed him among the pioneers of modern Swiss graphic design; in paintings of this period, he worked on curved and diagonal constructions. Success eventually allowed him to establish his own graphic design studio in Zürich.

He combined art with a political and moral awareness, which led him to be an activist for immigrants. In the 1930s, he was actively involved in protests, which were illegal under the government of the time. He continued to protest until the beginning of World War II.

In 1937, Lohse co-founded Allianz, an association of Swiss modern artists, with Leo Leuppi. Through this organization, he became a colleague of Anna Indermaur. In 1938, he helped Irmgard Burchard, to whom he was married for a brief time, to organise the London exhibition "Twentieth Century German Art". His political convictions then led him into the resistance movement, where he met his future wife Ida Alis Dürner.

The year 1943 marked a breakthrough in Lohse's painting: he standardised the pictorial means and started to develop modular and serial systems. In 1953, he published the book New Design in Exhibitions, and from 1958, he became co-editor of the magazine Neue Grafik.

Lohse's typical classic paintings are nonrepresentational, systematic, two-dimensional laminar planes of interacting colour elements in various logical/mathematical relations visible to the eye, using the structure of colour that we perceive, and in a way that every element plays an equal qualitative role.

He died in Zürich in 1988.

Detailed biography
1902
Born 13 September in Zürich

1917
First realistic paintings

1918
Apprentice in graphic design at Max Dalang AG (until 1922);
studies at the Kunstgewerbeschule Zürich under Ernst Keller

1922
Employed in the advertising studio of Max Dalang AG, where he meets Hans Neuburg and Anton Stankowski

1925
Still lifes, landscapes, cubist experimental paintings

1930
Establishes own graphic design studio in Zürich (1931-1934 with former Dalang co-worker Hans Trommer)

1933
Political support for émigrés;
illegal political activities until end of World War II;
co-founder of the Association of Independent Graphic Designers;
begins graphic design work for landscape architect Walter Mertens (until 1944)

1934
Studio and apartment in the Zett-Haus, Zürich, together with artist and gallerist Irmgard Burchard;
member of the association Friends of New Architecture

1935
Curvations

1936
Marriage to Irmgard Burchard (born 1908 in Zürich, died 1964 in Cairo);
participates in the exhibition "Zeitprobleme in der Schweizer Malerei", Kunsthaus Zürich

1937
Co-founder and vice-chairman of Allianz, Association of Modern Swiss Artists;
constructions

1938
Collaboration for the exhibition "Twentieth Century German Art", New Burlington Galleries, London, initiated by Irmgard Burchard;
installs a print exhibition of German and Russian constructivists in Zürich;
begins book design work for Büchergilde Gutenberg (until 1954)

1939
Divorce from Irmgard Burchard;
collaboration for the Swiss national exhibition "Landi", Zürich;
begins graphic design work for turbine builder Escher Wyss (until 1969)

1940
May: Destroys political documents and graphic design works;
sketches ideas of diagonal, vertical and horizontal structures;
co-editor and book designer of Almanac of New Art in Switzerland

1942
Marriage to Ida Alis Dürner (born 1907 in Uttwil, died 1989 in Zürich);
summer: Ida Alis travels to the camp in Gurs (France) to support persecuted people;
member of the Swiss Werkbund;
standardisation of the pictorial means: additive vertical series, objective rhythmic, serial structure systems, quantitative colour equality;
participates in the exhibition "Allianz", Kunsthaus Zürich

1943
First modular and serial systems

1944
Birth of daughter Johanna; 
works on the publications abstrakt/konkret and Plan;
participates in the exhibition "Concrete Art", Kunsthalle, Basel

1946
Group thematics;
book design for Carola Giedion-Welcker, Poètes à l'Ecart – Anthologie der Abseitigen

1947
Organises with Leo Leuppi the exhibition "Concrete, Abstract, Surrealist Art in Switzerland", Kunstmuseum St. Gallen;
participates in the exhibition "Abstract and Concrete Art", Palazzo Exreale, Milano;
designer and editor of the architectural review Bauen+Wohnen / Building+Home (until 1956);
begins graphic design work for Wohnbedarf (until 1968)

1948
Organiser of the Swiss section in the Salon des Réalités Nouvelles, Paris (also 1950);
participates in the exhibition "Tendencies in Abstract Art", Galerie Denise René, Paris;
"Interrelations between Art and Architecture", a didactic concept for the Architecture Department of the Swiss Federal Institute of Technology, Zürich

1949
Swiss Prize for Painting;
attends the CIAM conference, Bergamo

1951
Organises with Sigfried Giedion the Swiss section at the "International Water Color Exhibition" Brooklyn, New York;
participates in the 1st Biennale, São Paulo;
book design for Sigfried Giedion, CIAM – A Decade of New Architecture;
at the 9th Triennale, Milano the review Bauen+Wohnen is awarded the prize "Compasso d'Oro"

1952
"World Exhibition of Photography", Lucerne – thematic design of the sections Art & Photography and Architecture & Photography

1953
Author and book designer of New Design in Exhibitions; 
contributes to the review spirale

1954
Founding member of the artists’ and architects’ association espace, groupe suisse;
leading positions in the Swiss Werkbund (until 1966)

1957
Mural Three equal themes in five colours for the Swiss Pavilion at the 11th Milan Triennale, architect Alfred Roth (mural now in the Swiss Federal Institute of Technology, Zürich);
first one-person exhibition, Club Bel Etage, Zürich

1958
Edits the review Neue Grafik / New Graphic Design, Olten, with Josef Müller-Brockmann, Hans Neuburg and Carlo Vivarelli (until 1965)

1959
Editor of publication Friedrich Vordemberge-Gildewart on the occasion of his 60th birthday

1960
Retrospective exhibition, Kunstverein Ulm

1961
Retrospective exhibition, Stedelijk Museum, Amsterdam

1962
Member of the Exhibition Commission of the Kunsthaus, Zürich (until 1970)

1964
Mural Horizontal rhythm of two themes at the Wier housing estate, Ebnat-Kappel, architect Thomas Schmid

1965
Represents Switzerland at the 8th Biennale in São Paulo

1967
Wall design Four revolving door elements, Paradies-Lenggis school, Jona-Rapperswil, architect Kurt Federer (extended to eight elements in 1971)

1968
Participates in the documenta 4, Kassel

1969
Assists in the creation of the McCrory Corporation Collection, New York (until 1975)

1971
Sikkens Prize of the Netherlands;
one-person exhibition, Moderna Museet, Stockholm

1972
Represents Switzerland at the 36th Biennale, Venezia

1973
Art Prize of the City of Zürich. With the prize money of 12,000 Swiss Francs, Lohse acquires works by 13 young Swiss constructive artists and donates them to the Kunsthaus Zürich;
monograph Richard Paul Lohse, DuMont, Köln

1975
Appeal to the French Minister of Culture, André Malraux, for the renovation of the Villa Savoie of Le Corbusier (with the SWB and BSA);
exhibition "Modular and Serial Orders", Kunsthalle Düsseldorf (1976 Kunsthaus Zürich)

1977
"World Print Competition 77" prize, San Francisco;
honorary member of "Group of Systematic-Constructive Art", Gorinchem, Netherlands

1978
Exhibition "9 Squares", Van Abbemuseum, Eindhoven, Netherlands

1982
Participates in the documenta 7, Kassel with Thematic series in 18 colours A, B and C;
mural Complementary colour series for the reading room of the Canton Zürich State Archive, architects Jakob Schilling, Claudia Bersin;
honoured by the City of Zürich on 80th birthday

1983
Appeal to Jack Lang, French Minister of Culture, for the renovation of the Aubette, Strasbourg

1986
One-person exhibition, Vienna Secession, and honorary member of the Vienna Secession

1987
Appointed Commander of the Order of Arts and Letters of the French Republic by the Minister of Culture, Jack Lang;
honoured by the City of Zürich on 85th birthday;
establishes the Richard Paul Lohse Foundation, Zürich

1988
Painting Grenoble 1788, commissioned by the French State to commemorate the 200th anniversary of the French Revolution in Grenoble in 1788;
retrospective exhibition at the Musée de Grenoble;
died 16 September in Zürich

References

External links 
 Richard Paul Lohse  Site focused on his graphic design work. Includes articles, bibliography and comprehensive gallery, at Neugraphic.com [retrieved 9 March 2021].  
 

20th-century Swiss painters
Swiss male painters
Swiss contemporary artists
1902 births
1988 deaths
Zurich University of the Arts alumni
20th-century Swiss male artists